The following highways are numbered 700:

Canada 
 Saskatchewan Highway 700

Costa Rica
 National Route 700

Korea, South
 Daegu Ring Expressway

United States